The 1935–36 GET-ligaen season was the second season of ice hockey in Norway. Eight teams participated in the league, and Grane won the championship.

Regular season

External links 
 Norwegian Ice Hockey Federation 

Nor
GET-ligaen seasons
1935–36 in Norwegian ice hockey